Francesco Cernuto (born 25 January 1992) is an Italian footballer who plays as a defender for Paganese.

Club career
He made his Serie C debut for Treviso on 2 September 2012 in a game against Cuneo.

On 2 September 2019, he signed a 2-year contract with Triestina.

On 31 January 2021 he moved to Paganese.

References

External links
 

1992 births
People from Milazzo
Sportspeople from the Province of Messina
Living people
Italian footballers
Treviso F.B.C. 1993 players
Venezia F.C. players
U.S. Triestina Calcio 1918 players
Paganese Calcio 1926 players
Serie B players
Serie C players
Serie D players
Association football defenders
Footballers from Sicily